Jabez L. Peck (December 7, 1826 – April 5, 1895) was an American businessman and politician who served on the Common Council, Board of Aldermen, and as Mayor, of Pittsfield, Massachusetts.

Notes

1826 births
1895 deaths
Massachusetts city council members
Mayors of Pittsfield, Massachusetts
Massachusetts Republicans
19th-century American politicians